Ahmad ibn Harb al-Nisaburi was a noted ascetic of Nishapur, a reliable traditionist and a fighter in the holy wars. He visited Baghdad in the time of Ahmad ibn Hanbal and taught there; he died in Islamic golden age 234 (849) at the age of 85.

References

Iranian Sufis
760s births
849 deaths
9th-century Sufis